The Burning Zone is an American science fiction drama television series created by Coleman Luck that originally aired for one season on United Paramount Network (UPN) from September 3, 1996 to May 20, 1997. The series follows a government task force assigned to investigate chemical and biological threats. Initially, the program focused on the virologist Edward Marcase (Jeffrey Dean Morgan) and Dr. Kimberly Shiroma (Tamlyn Tomita). In response to the show's low ratings, Marcase and Shiroma were removed in the middle of the season. Dr. Daniel Cassian (Michael Harris) became the lead character, and a new character, Dr. Brian Taft (Bradford Tatum), joined the task force. The Burning Zone initially incorporated supernatural and religious elements, but shifted towards more action-oriented storylines.

The series was the only drama ordered by UPN for the 1996–97 television season. It was paired with the sitcoms Moesha and Homeboys in Outer Space. The Burning Zone has never been released on DVD or Blu-ray, or made available on online-streaming services. Critical response to The Burning Zone was primarily negative; commentators were divided over its storylines and tone. It received comparisons to other science-fiction shows of the time, especially The X-Files. Kasumi Mihori and Billy Pittard were nominated for the Primetime Emmy Award for Outstanding Main Title Design for the 49th Primetime Emmy Awards for their contributions to the series.

Premise and characters 

The Burning Zone is a science-fiction drama about a task force that investigates biochemical emergencies. Funded by the United States government, the team includes a virologist, a geneticist, a security specialist, and a bureaucrat. Set during a global rise in lethal diseases, known as the Plague Wars, the show includes hard science storylines resolved through spiritual solutions, including the efficacy of prayer and the power of a "healthy soul". When discussing the show's premise, critics had varying opinions on its inspiration. Comparisons were drawn to  television films, B movies, and news headlines, and the Chicago Tribune's Allan Johnson summed up The Burning Zone as a "mutant-disease-of-the-week series".

The task force includes virologist Edward Marcase (Jeffrey Dean Morgan) who survived a case of Ebola virus disease as a child, although his parents died from the virus. Devoting his life to researching the virus, he approaches the process of handling and curing a diseases as a "mystical experience" or a "supernatural quest". Johnson likened Marcase to Fox Mulder, a fictional character from The X-Files, due to his "almost mystical relationship with diseases". Caryn James of The New York Times wrote that Morgan played Marcase with "a brooding style". Marcase works closely with Dr. Kimberly Shiroma (Tamlyn Tomita), who specialized in molecular genetics and pathology during her time at the World Health Organization. She blames Marcase for her fiancé's death. James compared Marcase's relationship with Shiroma to that between The X-Files Mulder and Dana Scully. The team's other members include Michael Hailey (James Black) and Dr. Daniel Cassian (Michael Harris). Hailey handles the task force's security, while using his previous work experience with the Central Intelligence Agency. The group's leader Cassian is portrayed as a "no-nonsense doctor" with a high security clearance and a "firm grip over his emotions".

In response to the show's low ratings, United Paramount Network (UPN) removed Marcase and Shiroma with "only the briefest of explanations". Cassain subsequently became the lead character, despite previously being portrayed as "a kind of Dr. Smith-like thorn in the side". Critic John Kenneth Muir referred to the casting changes as "a behind-the-scenes massacre". Dr. Brian Taft (Bradford Tatum) was added to the show after Marcase and Shiroma's exit. Muir described Taft as "a motorcycle-riding, rebellious James Dean-like physician". Storylines shifted away from supernatural cases to include more action. Science fiction writers Roger Fulton and John Gregory Betancourt wrote that the program had "so many transformations in its brief 19-episode run that no viewer who saw the first show would recognize the last". Morgan and Tomita appear in 11 episodes while Todd Susman was in two episodes. Black appears in all 19 episodes, and Harris and Tatum are in 18 episodes and eight episodes, respectively.

Production and broadcast history 
Produced by Universal Television, The Burning Zone was created by Coleman Luck, who was an executive producer alongside James Duff McAdams and Carleton Eastlake. Consultation for the episodes was provided by an infectious-disease expert, Dr. Kimberly A. Shriner. One of six shows ordered by UPN, The Burning Zone was the network's only new drama for the 1996–97 television season. It was the final program announced as a part of UPN's 1996-97 line-up.

John Kenneth Muir cited The Burning Zone as an example of how the mid-1990s was "the great era of 'virus'-centric pop-culture entertainment". According to John Carman of the San Francisco Chronicle, The Burning Zone was one of the eight shows ordered for the 1996–97 television season that could be "classified as science fiction or at least very strange". Critics frequently compared the series to The X-Files. In the 1999 book Gen X TV: The Brady Bunch to Melrose Place, journalist Rob Owen described The Burning Zone as part of a 1996 trend of "X-Files rejects" that included Dark Skies and Millennium. The show also received comparisons to the 1995 film Outbreak and the 1971 film The Andromeda Strain.

The Burning Zone was broadcast on Tuesday nights at 9 pm EST, airing with the sitcoms Moesha and Homeboys in Outer Space. UPN included references to The X-Files in the promotional materials for the show. In a University of California, Los Angeles report, senior fellow Harlan Lebo wrote that The Burning Zone is one of two shows, along with The Sentinel, in the 1996–97 television season that received complaints for its use of violence. The network canceled The Burning Zone, and rescheduled Tuesday nights with four additional sitcoms, including Clueless. In 2012, Muir called for the show's release on home media, along with Sleepwalkers and Prey, but it has never been released on DVD or Blu-ray, or licensed to an online streaming service.

Episodes

Critical reception 
The critical response was primarily negative. Ken Tucker of Entertainment Weekly called the show "stiff, pretentious blarney" and an "unhealthy hugger-mugger", and cited its dialogue as one of its weaknesses. Bret Watson, writing for the same publication, dismissed The Burning Zone as "sci-fi schlock-fest". During a negative review of the special effects, Caryn James wrote that the "supposedly new microbe-imaging system look[ed] like the inside of a multicolored lava lamp". Scott D. Pierce panned the show's storylines for going "into the realm of ridiculous fantasy", and negatively compared the characters and dialogue to those of a soap opera. Allan Johnson criticized The Burning Zone as a poor replacement for UPN's previous series Nowhere Man, and requested that the network cancel The Burning Zone to revive Nowhere Man. In his review of the pilot, Johnson criticized Morgan's beard for making him appear "like he spent more time at college kegger parties than studying germs". John Kenneth Muir called The Burning Zone "a one-season blunder".

Some critics had more positive remarks for The Burning Zone. Kasumi Mihori and Billy Pittard received a nomination for the Primetime Emmy Award for Outstanding Main Title Design for the 49th Primetime Emmy Awards for their work on the show's main title. James Endrst praised the production, though he had a more mixed response for the show's "B-level stars and performances". Caryn James praised the episodes for containing "the loopy delights of a cut-rate, over-the-top horror movie", but questioned their intended tone due to the actors' serious portrayals of their characters. James felt that the show should have embraced "its silliest, campiest instincts".

References

Citations

Book sources

External links 

1990s American drama television series
1996 American television series debuts
1997 American television series endings
UPN original programming
English-language television shows
Television series by Universal Television
Television series about viral outbreaks